Sonorama 2015, or Sonorama Ribera 2015, will be the 18th edition of the Sonorama Music Festival. It will take place in Aranda de Duero, Castile and León, (Spain) during mid August. It is organized by the non-profit cultural association "Art de Troya". The four-day music festival is expected to attract 40,000 spectators.

International bands 
 Anna Calvi 
 Calexico
 Clap Your Hands Say Yeah
 The Royal Concept
 Monarchy
 2ManyDJs

Spanish bands  
 Vetusta Morla
 Supersubmarina
 Vive Morente (Estrella Morente + Soleá Morente + Los Evangelistas: Jota (Los Planetas) + Eric Jiménez + Florent Muñoz + Antonio Arias (Lagartija Nick))
 Arizona Baby
 Australian Blonde (only performance in festivals 2015)
 Carlos Jean
 Sidonie
 Xoél López
 Dorian
 Los Toreros Muertos
 Toundra
 Bigott
 Grupo de Expertos Solynieve
 Marlango
 Lichis
 Eme Dj
 Dinero
 Jero Romero
 Miguel Campello
 Joe Crepúsculo
 Sexy Zebras
 Fetén Fetén with Mastretta
 La Habitación Roja 
 Acróbata
 Rufus T. Firefly
 La M.O.D.A.
 Ángel Stanich
 Aloha Carmouna
 Analogic
 Ángel Pop
 Ara Musa
 Bambinika
 Belize
 Bizgana
 Blusa (banda)
 Blutaski Dj
 Bye Bye Lullabye
 Canciller Polaco
 Casual Groupies
 Charanga Los Sobrinos de la Tía Damiana
 Chema Rey Dj
 Club del Río
 Con X de Banjo
 Corbat and Bola
 Correos
 Corrientes Circulares Dj Set
 The New Technocrats
 Digital XXI
 Dj Filo
 Dj La Fábrica de Colores
 Dj Ziry
 Don Gonzalo
 Durango 14
 El Cantaitor
 Eladio y los Seres Queridos
 Estereoclub Estereo
 Estrogenuinas
 Fast Forward (banda)
 Full (band)
 Jacobo Serra
 Julian Maeso
 Kube (band)
 ...

See also 
 Sonorama
 Music of Spain

References

External links
 Festival Sonorama Ribera Official website.
 Facebook Fan page
 Twitter Fan page

Music festivals in Spain
2015 in Spanish music